Ruy Hellmeister Novais was a Brazilian politician from Campinas, who was twice elected mayor of the city, from 1956 to 1959 and from 1964 to 1969. During his second mandate he was noted for promoting a comprehensive modernization program of the city's infrastructure, including the modern municipal administration building.

References

Living people
Mayors of Campinas
Brazilian people of German descent
Year of birth missing (living people)
Brazilian Socialist Party politicians